Palazzo Versace Dubai is a hotel and resort completed in Culture Village on the foreshore of Dubai Creek in Dubai, United Arab Emirates.

Overview
It has 215 hotel rooms and suites, 169 residences, and 8 restaurants and bars. The landscaped gardens offer views of the Dubai Creek and skyline.

References

External links
Official website

Hotels in Dubai
Versace